The John M. Hopkins Cabin, located in the Okefenokee National Wildlife Refuge south of Folkston, Georgia, off GA 121/23 in Charlton County, Georgia, is a log cabin built in 1927.  It was listed on the National Register of Historic Places in 1983.
 
It is a  house built of end-notched heart pine logs, with a foundation of hexagonal heart pine blocks.  It has also been known as Quarters #12 - Quest Cabin.

References

External links

Houses on the National Register of Historic Places in Georgia (U.S. state)
Buildings and structures completed in 1927
National Register of Historic Places in Charlton County, Georgia
Log cabins